The 2018 NCAA Division II Men's Soccer Championship was the 47th annual single-elimination tournament to determine the national champion of NCAA Division II men's collegiate soccer in the United States. The semifinals and championship game were played at Highmark Stadium in Pittsburgh, Pennsylvania from November 29–December 1, 2018, while the preceding rounds were played at various sites across the country during November 2018.

The Barry Buccaneers defeated West Chester, 2–1, in the DII College Cup Final. James Kirkham and Steven Kosmala scored goals in the final 12 minutes of the second half to give the Buccaneers the school's first men's soccer national title. Barry, who finished the season 16-4-3, were coached by Steve McCrath.

Qualification

Qualified Teams

Tournament bracket

Division II College Cup

Final

References 

NCAA Division II Men's Soccer Championship
NCAA Division II Men's Soccer Championship
NCAA Division II Men's Soccer Championship
NCAA Division II Men's Soccer Championship